The Sri Lanka Overseas Service (SLOS) (Sinhala: ශ්‍රී ලංකා විදේශ සේවය; śrī laṁkā vidēśa sēvaya) which is most commonly referred to as the Sri Lanka Foreign Service is the foreign service of Sri Lanka. It is the body of career diplomats of Sri Lanka. The Permanent Secretary of the Ministry of Foreign Affairs is also the head of the foreign service.

History
Established on 1 October 1949 after the independence of Ceylon in 1948 as the Ceylon Overseas Service with the recruitment of its first batch of cadets. The service was dealt with foreign affairs, as opposed to the older Ceylon Civil Service, which dealt with domestic affairs. Following Sri Lanka becoming a republic in 1972 the service changed its name to Sri Lanka Overseas Service.

Selection and training
Members to the foreign service are selected every few years after an exam carried out by the Department of Examinations. The select recruits undergo training at the Bandaranaike International Diplomatic Training Institute and the Sri Lanka Institute of Development Administration

Secretary to the Ministry of Foreign Affairs

 Ms Aruni Wijewardane (May 2022 - to date) 
 Mr Ravinatha Aryasinha (31 Oct 2018 - 14 August 2020) 
 Mr Prasad_Kariyawasam (16 Aug 2017 - )
 Mr Esala Weerakoon (1 Aug 2016 - ) 
 Ms Chitranganee Wagiswara (19 Jan 2015 - ) 
 Ms Kshenuka Senewiratne (Jan 2014 - )

Positions

At the Ministry of Foreign Affairs
 Secretary to the Ministry of Foreign Affairs (Appointed by the President)
 Additional Secretary (Appointed by the Public Service Commission)
 Director General (Grade I)
 Director (Grade II/Grade III)
 Deputy Director (Grade III)
 Assistant Secretary (Grade III - entry level)

At a Diplomatic mission:
Ambassador//High Commissioner /Permanent Representative in UN (PRUN) (Grade I)
Deputy Chief of Mission/Deputy High Commissioner (Grade II)
Minister (Grade II)
Minister-counselor (Grade II)
Counselor (Grade II)
First Secretary (Grade III)
Second Secretary (Grade III -conformation of service)
Third Secretary (Grade III - entry level, probation)

At a consulate:
Consul General (Grade II)
Consul (Grade III)
Vice Consul (Grade III)

Criticism 
The Sri Lanka Foreign Service has been underutilized by the politicization of the Service, with appointments from outside the Service to Sri Lanka Missions abroad becoming the norm. This has resulted in the degradation of the implementation of the foreign policy of Sri Lanka.

Allegations of fraud and misuse of public money has also been levelled at some of those who have been appointed.

Due to the sporadic recruitment to the Sri Lanka Foreign Service, other Public Sector officers are also appointed to diplomatic posts, with several attempts made in the past to amalgamate the Sri Lanka Foreign Service with the Sri Lanka Administrative Service.

Former notable members of the SLOS
Asoka Girihagama
 Vernon Mendis
Bernard Tilakaratna
Wilhelm Woutersz
H. M. G. S. Palihakkara
Jayantha Dhanapala
Susantha De Alwis
Yogendra Duraiswamy

See also
Ministry of External Affairs
Public Services of Sri Lanka
Sri Lanka Administrative Service
Ambassadors and High Commissioners of Sri Lanka
Sri Lankan Non Career Diplomats
List of diplomatic missions in Sri Lanka
Diplomatic missions of Sri Lanka
Foreign relations of Sri Lanka

References

External links
Ministry of External Affairs

Government of Sri Lanka
Foreign relations of Sri Lanka

Overseas Service
Diplomatic services